Pelechuco Municipality is the second municipal section of the Franz Tamayo Province in the  La Paz Department, Bolivia. IN 2001 it had apopulation of 5,115. Its seat is Pelechuco.

The municipality is bordered to the north by the Apolo Municipality, to the east by the Apolo and Curva Municipalities, to the south by the Curva and Charazani Municipalities and to the west by Peru.

Geography 
The Apolobamba mountain range traverses the municipality. Other mountains are listed below:

Division 
Pelechuco Municipality is subdivided into the following four cantons:
 Antaquilla de Copacabana - 964 inhabitants (2001) 
 Pelechuco - 2,756 inhabitants 
 Suches - 227 inhabitants
 Ulla Ulla - 1,168 inhabitants

Places of interest 
Some of the tourist attractions of the municipalities are:
 Katantica, one of the most important peaks of the Apolobamba mountain range, about 5,592 m high, in Pelechuco Canton
 the colonial town of Pelechuco
 the village of Queara near Pelechuco which is also situated in the highest area of Madidi National Park
 the Ulla Ulla National Reserve in Ulla Ulla Canton which today is part of the Apolobamba Integrated Management Natural Area
 the pre-Hispanic Guanan ruins in Pelechuco Canton
 Cololo Lake in Antaquilla de Copacabana Canton
 Suches Lake on the border to Peru

See also 
 K'ayrani Quta
 K'iski Quta
 Pelechuco River

References 

 www.ine.gov.bo / census 2001: Pelechuco Municipality

External links 
 Pelechuco Municipality: population data and map

Municipalities of La Paz Department (Bolivia)